Adrian Banaszek (born 21 October 1993) is a Polish cyclist, who currently rides for UCI Continental team . His brother Norbert Banaszek and cousin Alan Banaszek are also professional cyclists with the  team.

Major results

2013
 1st Stage 4 (TTT) Dookoła Mazowsza
2014
 4th Puchar Ministra Obrony Narodowej
2015
 5th Memoriał Andrzeja Trochanowskiego
 5th Memoriał Romana Siemińskiego
 10th Road race, UEC European Under-23 Road Championships
2016
 2nd Overall Dookoła Mazowsza
1st Prologue
 7th Memorial Grundmanna I Wizowskiego
 9th Korona Kocich Gór
2017
 1st Prologue Dookoła Mazowsza
2018
 3rd Grand Prix Doliny Baryczy Milicz
 4th Overall Dookoła Mazowsza
 6th Memoriał Henryka Łasaka
 7th Memorial Grundmanna I Wizowskiego
 9th Memoriał Romana Siemińskiego
2019
 9th Visegrad 4 Bicycle Race – GP Slovakia
2020
 7th Overall Dookoła Mazowsza
 8th Overall Tour Bitwa Warszawska 1920
2021
 4th Overall Tour of Szeklerland
 5th Puchar Ministra Obrony Narodowej
 8th Overall Tour of Estonia
2022
 1st Stage 1 (TTT) Belgrade Banjaluka

References

External links

1993 births
Living people
Polish male cyclists
People from Grodzisk Mazowiecki County
21st-century Polish people